The E. M. Phillips House is a historic house at 35 Dresser Street in Southbridge, Massachusetts.  The two story L-shaped house was built in 1871 for E. M. Phillips, a local insurance agent.  Its styling is Italianate: its main body is three window bays wide, there are brackets in the eaves and gable pitch, and the gables have small round-arch windows.  After Phillips, the house was briefly occupied by Herbert E. Wells, son of Hiram C. Wells, owner of the locally important American Optical Company.  The company later acquired the house and used it as employee housing.

The house was listed on the National Register of Historic Places in 1989.

See also
National Register of Historic Places listings in Southbridge, Massachusetts
National Register of Historic Places listings in Worcester County, Massachusetts

References

Houses in Southbridge, Massachusetts
Italianate architecture in Massachusetts
Houses completed in 1871
National Register of Historic Places in Southbridge, Massachusetts
Houses on the National Register of Historic Places in Worcester County, Massachusetts